is a former Japanese football player.

Club statistics

References

External links

1981 births
Living people
Kokushikan University alumni
Association football people from Shizuoka Prefecture
Japanese footballers
J1 League players
J2 League players
Shonan Bellmare players
Omiya Ardija players
Oita Trinita players
Expatriate footballers in Thailand
Universiade gold medalists for Japan
Universiade medalists in football
Association football defenders